Costa San Savino is a  of the  of Costacciaro in the Province of Perugia, Umbria, central Italy. It stands at an elevation of 599 metres above sea level. At the time of the Istat census of 2001 it had 139 inhabitants.

References 

Frazioni of the Province of Perugia